Events in the year 2012 in Slovenia.

Incumbents
President:Danilo Türk (until 22 December); then Borut Pahor
Prime Minister: Borut Pahor (until 10 February); Janez Janša

Events

10 February – Janez Janša takes over as prime minister
11 November – Slovenian presidential election, 2012
2 December – Borut Pahor wins the Slovenian presidential election runoff
22 December – Borut Pahor takes over as President

2012–13 Slovenian protests
2012–13 Maribor protests

Deaths

16 February – Mitja Brodar, archaeologist (b. 1921)
13 July – Polde Bibič, actor, writer and academic (b. 1933).
11 November – Tomaž Ertl, politician (b. 1932)
17 November – Branko Elsner, footballer (b. 1929).

References

 
Years of the 21st century in Slovenia
Slovenia
Slovenia
2010s in Slovenia